The Organization of Cooperating Autonomous Trade Unions (OSAV) is a trade union federation in Suriname. It was founded in 1985 out of a leadership dispute at the General Alliance of Labour Unions in Suriname.

The OSAV is affiliated with the International Trade Union Confederation.

References

Trade unions in Suriname
International Trade Union Confederation
Trade unions established in 1985
1985 establishments in Suriname